

Troubridge Hill  Aquatic Reserve is a marine protected area in the Australian state of South Australia located in Investigator Strait adjoining the south coast of Yorke Peninsula at the headland of Troubridge Hill.

It was declared in 1984 for the ‘"protection of marine habitat and associated organisms and for education and recreation purposes." The collection or removal of any marine organism is prohibited with the exception of organisms collected by  line fishing. The following activities are permitted - boating, recreational diving and swimming. The wrecksite of the SS Clan Ranald is located within the aquatic reserve.

Since 2012, it has been located within the boundaries of a habitat protection zone within the Lower Yorke Peninsula Marine Park.

The aquatic reserve is classified as an IUCN Category VI protected area.

See also
Protected areas of South Australia
Troubridge (disambiguation)

References

External links
Entry for Troubridge Hill Aquatic Reserve on Protected Planet website	

Aquatic reserves of South Australia
Protected areas established in 1984  
1984 establishments in Australia
Investigator Strait